Mohamed Issa Al-Thawadi (born November 18, 1981) is a Qatari sprint hurdler. Al-Thawadi represented Qatar at the 2008 Summer Olympics in Beijing, where he competed for the men's 110 metres hurdles. He ran in the sixth heat against seven other athletes including defending Olympic champion Liu Xiang of China. While his strongest opponent did not complete the hurdle lap because of a serious injury, Al-Thawadi gladly finished in fifth place with his seasonal best time of 13.64 seconds. Although he ranked below the four mandatory slots, Al-Thawadi qualified for the next phase of the competition based on his time and performance in the heats. For the second round, Al-Thawadi, however, was disqualified from the competition, for being responsible to the second false start of the third heat.

References

External links

NBC 2008 Olympics profile

1981 births
Living people
Qatari male hurdlers
Olympic athletes of Qatar
Athletes (track and field) at the 2008 Summer Olympics
Athletes (track and field) at the 2002 Asian Games
Athletes (track and field) at the 2006 Asian Games
Asian Games competitors for Qatar